Hans Kristian Gaarder (30 November 19606 April 2021) was a Norwegian conspiracy theorist and COVID-19 denialist who died in 2021 at age 60 after becoming infected with COVID-19. He lived in the municipality of Gran in Hadeland, Norway. Prior to his death, he had hosted a number of illegal gatherings. Gaarder had previously been involved in conspiracy theories related to swine flu and the Illuminati.

He is believed to have been one of the creators of the Norwegian online alternative-news magazine "" ("The News Mirror").

References 

1960 births
2021 deaths
Norwegian conspiracy theorists
People from Gran, Norway
Deaths from the COVID-19 pandemic in Norway
COVID-19 conspiracy theorists
Anti-vaccination activist deaths from the COVID-19 pandemic